Sigurd Lunde (4 June 1874 – 3 December 1936) was a Norwegian architect. He was born in Bergen, Norway. From 1894–95, he worked as an assistant to architect Jens Zetlitz Monrad Kielland. He attended the Technical University of Berlin (Königlich Technical Hochschule, Charlottenburg) from 1896–98, and established his own practice in Bergen in 1898. From 1904–1906 he worked in Ålesund, participating in rebuilding the city after the 1904 fire.
He became one of the more prolific architects in western Norway. He also designed interiors and furniture.

In 1901 he married Inga Grue (1870–1948), with whom he had a son, Nazi ideologist and politician Gulbrand Lunde.

Selected works
 Apotekergata in Ålesund (1904–05)
 Steffensengården, Hellegaten 1 in Ålesund (1904–05)
 Hoffgården, Kongens gate 19 in Ålesund (1906–07)
 Schieldrops Hotel, Kongens gate 28 in Ålesund (1906)

References

1874 births
1936 deaths
Architects from Bergen
Norwegian expatriates in Germany
Technical University of Berlin alumni